Robert Chemonges (born 15 October 1997) is a Ugandan long distance runner. He competed in the men's marathon at the 2017 World Championships in Athletics, placing 43rd in the time of 2:21:24. He won the men's half marathon event at the inaugural African Beach Games in 2019 with a time of 1:04:48.

References

External links

1997 births
Living people
Ugandan male long-distance runners
Ugandan male marathon runners
World Athletics Championships athletes for Uganda
Athletes (track and field) at the 2018 Commonwealth Games
Commonwealth Games competitors for Uganda
Place of birth missing (living people)
Ugandan mountain runners
Athletes (track and field) at the 2019 African Games
World Mountain Running Championships winners
African Games competitors for Uganda
21st-century Ugandan people